Major Axel von Blomberg (1908 – 15 May 1941) was an officer in the German Air Force (Luftwaffe) before and during the Second World War. He is best known for the role he played during the Anglo-Iraqi War.

Biography
Blomberg was a son of Field Marshal Werner von Blomberg.

He was part of a German military mission to the Kingdom of Iraq which had the cover name "Special Staff F" (Sonderstab F). Sonderstab F was commanded by General (General der Flieger) Hellmuth Felmy, and Blomberg had the task of commanding a Brandenburgers reconnaissance group that was to precede "Flyer Command Iraq" (Fliegerführer Irak).  He was also given the task of integrating Fliegerführer Irak with Iraqi forces in operations against the British.  As part of the latter, he was to raise a German-led Arab Brigade (Arabische Brigade) in Iraq from the thousands of volunteers available from Iraq, from Syria, from Palestine, from Saudi Arabia, and from throughout the Arab world.  Before Blomberg could accomplish any of his tasks, he was killed.

On 15 May 1941, Blomberg was sent to Baghdad to make arrangements for a council of war with the Iraqi government.  The council was planned for 17 May. However, Blomberg was killed by friendly fire from Iraqi positions.  His Heinkel 111 bomber was shot at from the ground as it flew low on approach and Blomberg was found to be dead upon landing.

His brother Henning von Blomberg, was a captain and divisional adjutant in the German 1st Light Division before the war and on 22 November 1942, as lieutenant colonel and commander of No. 190 Panzer Battalion, fell in battle near Mateur in Tunisia. He had been Blomberg's only surviving son. The wife of Henning von Blomberg was Ruth.

Following established practice, Blomberg's son-in-law, colonel Ulrich Bürker, the senior staff officer (Ia=the operations officer) in the 10th Panzer Division in Tunisia, was withdrawn from the front on 15 December and left his post in January 1943. Bürker was the Ia in the 10th Panzer Division from 1 August 1941 until 15 December 1942, during that time the division fought in the central sector of the Eastern Front, in April 1942 the division was sent to Amiens, France, for refitting, upon the Anglo-American landings in North Africa, the division participated in the occupation of Vichy France and in January 1943 the 10th Panzer Division was rushed to Tunisia as part of the 5th Panzer Army. Bürker became the Ia of Heeresgruppe B in February 1943. This command had just been transferred from the Eastern Front to Germany and was eventually sent to northern Italy (and then France). Bürker spent some time with OKW but by early 1944 he was a corps, then an army, chief of staff, first in the Balkans then on the Eastern Front. He was awarded the Knight's cross for his service with the 10th Panzer Division.
 
Bürker's successor was mayor Wilhelm Bürklin, Bürklin and the longtime division commander ran over a mine in their command vehicle on 1 February 1943, the division commander the veteran mayor-general Wolfgang Fischer, was killed and Bürklin badly wounded. On 3 or 4 February lieutenant colonel Claus von Stauffenberg received his orders to take over as senior staff officer (Ia) in the 10th Panzer Division, and during the period it took for him to get there the army group Id, major Josef Moll, filled in as the Ia.

One of the other Blomberg's  daughters was married to Keitel's son Karl-Heinz. Karl-Heinz Keitel was sent to the Cavalry School and he eventually transferred to the Waffen SS, commanded units and was decorated.

See also
 Führer Directive No. 30
 Brandenburgers
 Mohammad Amin al-Husayni
 Fritz Grobba

Notes
Footnotes

Citations

References

Blomberg
1908 births
1941 deaths
Victims of aviation accidents or incidents in Iraq
Luftwaffe personnel killed in World War II